Orsodacne atra is a species of leaf beetle in the family Orsodacnidae. It is found in Central America and North America.

References

Further reading

 

Orsodacnidae
Articles created by Qbugbot
Beetles described in 1810